Bligny-lès-Beaune (literally Bligny near Beaune) is a commune in the Côte-d'Or department in eastern France.

Population

Notable people
Jean Dard
Charlotte-Adélaïde Dard

See also
Communes of the Côte-d'Or department

References

External links

Communes of Côte-d'Or
Côte-d'Or communes articles needing translation from French Wikipedia